The 22955 / 22956 Kutch Superfast Express is a Superfast Express train belonging to Indian Railways that runs between Bandra Terminus and . It is a daily service. It operates as train number 22955 from Bandra Terminus to Bhuj and as train number 22956 in the reverse direction.

Initially it ran to/from  later it was amended to Bandra Terminus.

Coaches

22955/22956 Bandra Terminus–Bhuj Kutch Express has 1 AC 1st Class, 1 AC 2 tier, 4 AC 3 tier, 10 Sleeper Class & 3 Unreserved/General coaches.

As with most train services in India, coach composition may be amended at the discretion of Indian Railways depending on demand.

Service

22955 Bandra Terminus–Bhuj Kutch Express covers the distance of 839 km in 15 hours 05 mins (55.48 km/hr).

22956 Bhuj–Bandra Terminus Kutch Express covers the distance of 839 km in 15 hours 10 mins (55.19 km/hr).

As the average speed of the train in both directions is above , its fare includes a Superfast surcharge.

Route & Halts 

Traction

Initially it was hauled by a WCAM-1 engine until Ahmedabad. As Western Railway switched over to AC system in February 2012, it is hauled by a WAP-5 or WAP-4E engine from the Vadodara shed until  after which a Sabarmati-based WDP-4D takes over until Bhuj.

Train history

It was flagged off as 31DN/32UP Bombay Central–Gandhidham Express with 9 halts.
It was extended to Bhuj railway station on 3 June 2001 after completion of the Gandhidham–Bhuj BG line.
On 8 February 2008 this train was shifted to Bandra Terminus.
It used to run as 9031/9032 BDTS–New Bhuj Kutch Express.
It was further renumbered as 9131/9132 from 15 June 2008.
It will be made a Superfast Train with new number 22955/22956 Kutch Superfast Express from Date 1 October 2016.

Timetable

The 22955 Bandra Terminus–Bhuj Kutch Express leaves Bandra Terminus on a daily basis at 17:45 PM IST and reaches Bhuj at 08:50 AM IST the next day.

The 22956 Bhuj–Bandra Terminus Kutch Express leaves Bhuj on a daily basis at 20:15 PM IST and reaches Bandra Terminus at 11:25 AM IST the next day.

Gallery

External links

References 

Transport in Bhuj
Express trains in India
Transport in Mumbai
Rail transport in Gujarat
Transport in Kutch district
Rail transport in Maharashtra
Railway services introduced in 1984
Named passenger trains of India